is a Japanese anime director and bassist who is known for his work in UFO Baby and the Di Gi Charat series. He has served as the director for series such as Nanaka 6/17, Cromartie High School, Les Misérables: Shōjo Cosette, GA Geijutsuka Art Design Class, Maid Sama!, Nekogami Yaoyorozu, Jewelpet Happiness, The Disastrous Life of Saiki K., and The Demon Girl Next Door. He is married to Sayuri Ōba, an anime screenwriter.

Career
Sakurai was in college for 5 and a half years and spent his time playing in bands and bassist auditions. One day, he suddenly became interested in animation, and after graduating from the department of literature and science at Nihon University, he worked at Yoyogi Animation Academy and joined Studio World, which was looking for assistant directors, at the age of 25. The first work he was involved in as an assistant director was Super Dimension Cavalry Southern Cross, and the first time his name appeared in the credits was in Yoroshiku Mechadock. When he was in charge of Mechadock, Masayuki Kojima and Ken Baba served as his seniors. In the spring of 1988, Studio World disbanded and Sakurai moved to Film Magic, which was founded by Baba. In the middle of Akazukin Chacha, Film Magic went bankrupt due to reasons mentioned below, and after that he went freelance.

Style
According to Hatsuki Tsuji, Sakurai is described as someone who has good qualities, but who can be conceited. He often uses voice actors such as Mika Kanai and Kaori Nazuka in his directorial projects.

Inspired by the direction of Akitaro Daichi and Tatsuo Sato, who were part of Akazukin Chacha'''s rotation of directors, Sakurai was too elaborate in his direction and was unable to adhere to the limited number of sheets, resulting in constant deficits and driving Film Magic into bankruptcy. However, Takaaki Wada, who was in charge of key animation in certain episodes, claims that Sakurai, Wada and the other animators ignored the president's advice and got carried away, and that the bankruptcy was their own fault.

Sakurai is known for his love of the ukulele and for carrying one with him at all times, even to the studios. In addition, the soundtrack for Cromartie High School features music by the progressive rock band Bi Kyo Ran, who are from the same town as him and of whom he was a fan for many years, and also worked with the band as a bassist, later becoming a full member. He also played bass in the ending song "Dynamite★I-N-G" for TV Tokyo's Di Gi Charat Nyo!'' and performed a solo part. He stated that he had nine left-handed basses at the time.

Filmography

Anime

Film

References

External links
 

Japanese animators
Living people
1958 births
Japanese film directors
Anime directors
People from Shizuoka Prefecture